Jordan White may refer to:

 Jordan White (American football) (born 1988), American football wide receiver
 Jordan White (footballer) (born 1992), Scottish footballer
 Jordan White (musician) (born 1984), American rock musician
 Jordan White (ice hockey) (born 1988), Canadian ice hockey goaltender